Richard Strohmayer (born 16 March 1981) is an Austrian footballer and coach. As a player, he last played in the First League for First Vienna.

References

1981 births
Living people
Association football midfielders
Austrian footballers
Austrian football managers
First Vienna FC players
Austria under-21 international footballers